The Asbestos Disease Awareness Organization (ADAO) is a nonprofit organization in the U.S. dedicated to preventing asbestos exposure, eliminating asbestos-related diseases such as mesothelioma, and protecting asbestos victims' civil rights through education, advocacy, and community initiatives. ADAO was founded by Linda Reinstein and Doug Larkin in 2004 and is headquartered in Redondo Beach, California. Three boards lead it: the Board of Directors, Science Advisory Board, and Prevention Advisory Board.

Events and programs 

ADAO has:
 17 Annual Asbestos Awareness and Prevention Conferences.
 Organized a 2021 "Asbestos: Art, Advocacy, and Action" Film Festival.
 Championed 17 U.S. Senate Annual National Asbestos Awareness Week (April 1–7) Resolutions] 
 Provides Global Asbestos Awareness week educational campaigns.
 Produced numerous Public Service Announcements such as "What the Merchants of Death Won't Tell You: The Irrefutable Facts about Asbestos". 
 Presented at legislative hearings and medical symposiums in more than 20 countries, including being invited to testify before the U.S. Senate and House of Representatives.

References

External links 
 "Asbestos: elimination of asbestos-related diseases" World Health Organization
 "The stunning truth about asbestos use in the U.S. PBS Newshour
 ADAO to present testimony before the U.S. Senate Panel Committee on Environment and Public Works hearing entitled "An Examination of the Health Effects of Asbestos and Methods of Mitigating Such Impacts", June 12, 2007

Asbestos
Cancer organizations based in the United States
Lung disease organizations
Non-profit organizations based in California
Redondo Beach, California